Alessandro Defilippi is an Italian writer and screenwriter.

Born in Turin, he works as a psychoanalyst. His published works include the gothic tales collection Una lunga consuetudine (Sellerio, 1994) and two novels, Locus Animae (Passigli, 1999), a psychological thriller, and Angeli (Passigli 2002), a gothic novel with themes of mysticism, politics, ethics and philosophy.

He also worked on the screenplay for Prendimi l'anima, directed by Roberto Faenza, and has written poetry.

Bibliography
 Una lunga consuetudine (1994)
 Locus animae (1999)
 Angeli (2002)
 Cuori bui, usanze ignote (2006)
 Le Perdute Tracce Degli Dei (2008)
 Manca sempre una piccola cosa (2010)
 Danubio rosso. L'alba dei barbari (2011)
 Onryo, avatar di morte (2012)
 Per una cipolla di Tropea (2012)
 La paziente n° 9 (2009)
 Giallo panettone (2012)
 Il teorema dell'ombra (2014)

References 

Italian fantasy writers
Thriller writers
Year of birth missing (living people)
Living people